Thomas Bishop may refer to:

Thomas Bishop (MP) (by 1506–1560), English politician
Thomas Bishop (rower) (born 1947), British Olympic rower
Thomas B. Bishop (1840–1906), San Francisco attorney
Thomas Brigham Bishop (1835–1905), American composer of popular music
Thomas Otto Bishop (1877–1952), New Zealand politician
Thomas Bishop (Tompkins County, NY), member of the 56th New York State Legislature in 1833
Thomas O. Bishop, member of the New York State Assembly in 1850
Thomas P. Bishop, member of the New York State Assembly in 1857
Tommy Bishop (born 1940), English rugby player
Tom Bishop (triathlete) (born 1991), British triathlete

See also
Thomas Bishopp (disambiguation)
Bishop (surname)